Mariano Omar Barbieri (born 29 November 1990) is an Argentine professional footballer who plays as a winger for Belgrano.

Career
Barbieri's career began in 2008 with Flandria, he made one hundred and thirty-nine appearances for the club and scored eleven times. After five years with Flandria, Barbieri joined Primera B Metropolitana club Deportivo Morón. He scored four goals in thirty-seven games prior to leaving to sign for Argentine Primera División team Defensa y Justicia on loan in July 2014. 2016 saw Barbieri join fellow Primera División side Arsenal de Sarandí on loan. For Arsenal, Barbieri played thirteen matches and scored three goals prior to joining on a permanent basis. His stay was short as he was immediately sold to Belgrano.

He made his debut in a goalless draw against Olimpo on 18 September 2016, before going on to score three goals in thirty-one appearances over two seasons for Belgrano. In February 2018, Barbieri joined Chilean Primera División side Unión La Calera on loan. He scored two goals during a 1–3 away victory versus Everton on 7 April. Barbieri departed Belgrano permanently in January 2019, deciding to remain in Chile with Deportes Iquique.

Career statistics
.

References

External links

1990 births
Living people
People from Chivilcoy
Argentine footballers
Association football forwards
Argentine expatriate footballers
Expatriate footballers in Chile
Argentine expatriate sportspeople in Chile
Primera B Metropolitana players
Argentine Primera División players
Chilean Primera División players
Flandria footballers
Deportivo Morón footballers
Defensa y Justicia footballers
Arsenal de Sarandí footballers
Club Atlético Belgrano footballers
Unión La Calera footballers
Deportes Iquique footballers
Sportspeople from Buenos Aires Province